Friele (Kaffehuset Friele) is a Norwegian coffee manufacturer and brand based in Midtun, a commercial and residential district of the borough of Fana in Bergen, Norway. Friele is the largest producer of coffee in Norway. It is part of JDE Peet's.

Company history 
The company was started in 1799 when ship captain Herman Friele (1763–1843) landed in Bergen to start trading. He bought a property in Bergen and established an import business with emphasis  on coffee. Towards the middle of the 19th century, coffee consumption was growing due to falling prices from increased global production.
 Herman Friele ran the company until his retirement in 1835, when his youngest son Berent Friele (1810–1897) took over. In 1862, he took two partners on board; his son Herman Friele (1838–1921) and son-in-law Alexander B. Grieg. The company name was also changed to B. Friele & Sønner. Friele and Grieg owned the company together until 1897, when Grieg left and Friele's son Berent Friele (1862–1902) became partner. In 1900, the older Friele took another son Herman (1877–1961) on board as partner, and retired himself. When Berent died in 1902, Herman became the sole owner and remained so for many years. Berent's son Einar became junior executive in 1925, but was killed during World War II.

Friele was owned by the seventh generation and chairman Herman Friele until the sale of the company to DE Master Blenders 1753 in 2013. Friele buys its coffee beans from 9–10 different countries, mainly from Brazil and Kenya. Until the mid-1980s most of the coffee was sold in Western and Northern Norway, but since it has expanded throughout the country. The present plant was constructed in 1981.

Friele Frokost Kaffe is the leading brand with a market share of 29%. Friele's product line also includes the brands Kronekaffe and Café Noir. Collectively all the Friele coffee brands have a total national market share of 35%.

See also 
 List of oldest companies

References

External links
 Kaffehuset Friele official website

JDE Peet's
Food and drink companies of Norway
Manufacturing companies established in 1799
Manufacturing companies based in Bergen
Coffee brands
1799 establishments in Norway
Norwegian brands
Norwegian companies established in 1799
Coffee in Europe
Agriculture companies of Norway